John Gould Cotton (born 1951) is a retired vice admiral in the United States Navy. He was Chief of the United States Navy Reserve from October 2003 until July 2008. He is currently a member of the Defense Department's Reserve Forces Policy Board.

References

1951 births
United States Navy personnel of the Vietnam War
Commercial aviators
Living people
Recipients of the Legion of Merit
Recipients of the Navy Distinguished Service Medal
United States Naval Academy alumni
United States Naval Aviators
United States Navy vice admirals